Menoceras ("Crescent Horns") is a genus of extinct, small rhinoceros endemic to most of southern North America and ranged as far south as Panama during the early Miocene epoch.

Description
 
Male Menoceras sported two horns side by side at the tip of the nose, whereas the females were hornless. All other rhino genera, save the related genus Diceratherium, have their horns arranged one behind the other.

Paleobiology
Menoceras roamed across a tropical, savanna-like grassland and plains environment that covered much of North America. Because of the massive accumulations of fossil bones of this animal, particularly at Agate Springs Nebraska, Menoceras may have lived in large herds. Other sites include Martin-Anthony site Martin County, Florida, and Cady Mountains Horse Quarry, San Bernardino County, California.

Taxonomy

Menoceras was named by Troxell and assigned to Rhinocerotidae in 1921. It was synonymized subjectively with Diceratherium by Matthew in 1931 and Wood in 1964. Again assigned to Rhinocerotidae by Prothero, Guerrin, Manning in 1989. Tanner (1969), Wilson and Schiebout (1981), Prothero and Manning (1987), Carroll (1988) and Prothero et al. (1989); and to Menoceratinae by Prothero (1998).

Fossil distribution

Fossil distribution is as far north as New Jersey, south to Florida (3 collections) and Texas (6 collections), as far west as Nebraska (7 collections) and California (2 collections).

The Panamanian find was determined to be 19.7 Ma (AEO). It was found in the Gaillard Cut in Panama in "a 45 m thick section (narrow stratigraphic interval)" It was reposited in the Smithsonian Institution, Washington, D.C.
Other sites: 
Lay Ranch Beds, Goshen County, Wyoming, a deposit of several carnivores and herbivores.
Agate Springs Quarries, Sioux County, Nebraska, a deposit of Miocene herbivores and carnivores such as Moropus elatus, Cynelos, Cephalogale, and a number of Artiodactyla.
Martin Canyon Quarry A, Logan County, Colorado, a very substantial number of carnivores and herbivores.

Notes

References
Prothero, Donald R. 2005. The Evolution of North American Rhinoceroses. Cambridge University Press, Cambridge, 218 pp. 

Miocene rhinoceroses
Miocene mammals of North America
Fossil taxa described in 1921